The Cyprus Museum of Natural History is a natural history museum on the outskirts of Nicosia, Cyprus.

The museum was founded by the Photos Photiades Charity, Scientific and Cultural Foundation, and is the largest museum of its kind in Cyprus. Its exhibits include stuffed animals of various sorts as well as fossils, shells, rocks, and minerals.

References

External links 
 Museum website

Museums with year of establishment missing
Museums in Nicosia
Natural history museums
National museums